The 2010 Copa del Rey Juvenil was the 60th staging of the tournament. The competition began on 16 May and ended on 26 June with the final.

First round

|}

Quarterfinals

|}

Semifinals

|}

Final

See also
2009–10 División de Honor Juvenil de Fútbol

External links
 Historical Spanish Juvenile Competition Results

Copa del Rey Juvenil de Fútbol
Juvenil